Comanche Springs was an aquifer of six artesian springs geographically located between the Edwards Plateau and the Trans-Pecos regions of West Texas. The military fortification Camp Stockton was built around the springs, eventually growing become the city of Fort Stockton.

The groundwater source originated from a Comanchean limestone fault combined within the bountiful Edwards Aquifer and the Glass Mountains. The natural spring has a physical geography routing north through Comanche Creek forming a confluence with Leon Creek and the Pecos River. The alluvial river is a tributary to the Rio Grande.

History

Rio Grandé and Spanish Expeditions

Comanche Springs served as an oasis with inhabitants dating to the Pre-Columbian era by the Jumano Indians. Álvar Núñez Cabeza de Vaca scouted the Rio Grande region in 1536. Fernando del Bosque explored the Rio Grandé area for Franciscans missionary districts in 1675 while Juan Domínguez de Mendoza lodged near the spring waters in the late 17th century.

Forts and West Frontier

On March 23, 1859, the Camp Stockton fortification was established in the Trans-Pecos region. The garrison served as cantonment for the United States Cavalry warding off Plains Indians seeking to disrupt and raid the American pioneer, Butterfield Overland Mail, Concord stagecoach, covered wagon, Old San Antonio Road, Old Spanish Trail, San Antonio-El Paso Road, San Antonio–San Diego Mail Line, and wagon trains.

Nomadic Culture of Plains Indians

The Apache, Comanche, and Kiowa visited the water basin frequently during bison and Colonial Spanish horse hunts, Comanche-Mexico War skirmishes, and Mexican Indian Wars in Northern Mexico. The Comanche Trail permitted the nomadic migration of Native Americans to the West Texas desert climate during the northern hemisphere winter solstice. The long-distance trail encompassed regional spring waters of Texas Big Bend Country given the horseback riding distance from the Staked Plains to Big Spring, Horsehead Crossing, Tunas Springs, Glenn Springs, San Vicente, Las Moras Springs, and Rio Grandé located within Big Bend National Park.

Irrigation of Arid Lands
Beginning in 1875, Comanche Springs was incorporated into an agricultural irrigation district resulting in the  hydrological regression of the natural springs in the Chihuahuan Desert domain. The  to  irrigation demand lead to the overdrafting of the natural springs aquifer diminishing the Trans-Pecos water table.

U.S. Federal Laws for Arid Lands Irrigation
U.S. Congressional legislation for irrigation of the State of Texas arid lands.

Case Law of Texas Rio Grandé & Trans-Pecos
 
  
  
 
 Forest Reserve Act of 1891

Historical Record
Comanche Springs received a Texas historic marker in 1968.

Illustrations

See also

References

Historical Video Archive

External links
 
 
 
 
 
 
 

Bodies of water of Pecos County, Texas
Springs of Texas